The 10th Filmfare Awards were held on 13 June 1963, honoring the best films in Hindi Cinema of the year 1962. 

Sahib Bibi Aur Ghulam led the ceremony with 8 nominations, followed by Bees Saal Baad with 7 nominations.

Bees Saal Baad and Sahib Bibi Aur Ghulam won 4 awards each, thus becoming the most-awarded films at the ceremony.

The ceremony marked the only occasion when all the nominations for Best Actor or Best Actress were for a single actor, with Meena Kumari receiving all 3 nominations for Best Actress for Aarti, Main Chup Rahungi and Sahib Bibi Aur Ghulam, winning for the lattermost.

Mehmood received dual nominations for Best Supporting Actor for his performances in Dil Tera Diwana and Rakhi, winning for the former.

Awards

Best Film
 Sahib Bibi Aur Ghulam 
Bees Saal Baad
Rakhi

Best Director
 Abrar Alvi – Sahib Bibi Aur Ghulam 
Biren Nag – Bees Saal Baad
Mehboob Khan – Son of India

Best Actor
 Ashok Kumar – Rakhi 
Guru Dutt – Sahib Bibi Aur Ghulam
Shammi Kapoor – Professor

Best Actress
 Meena Kumari – Sahib Bibi Aur Ghulam 
Meena Kumari – Aarti
Meena Kumari – Main Chup Rahungi

Best Supporting Actor
 Mehmood – Dil Tera Diwana 
Mehmood – Rakhi
Rehman – Sahib Bibi Aur Ghulam

Best Supporting Actress
 Shashikala – Aarti 
Lalita Pawar – Professor
Waheeda Rehman – Sahib Bibi Aur Ghulam

Best Music Director 
 Professor – Shankar-Jaikishan 
Anpadh – Madan Mohan
Bees Saal Baad – Hemanta Mukherjee

Best Lyricist
 Bees Saal Baad – Shakeel Badayuni for Kahin Deep Jale Kahin Dil 
Anpadh – Raja Mehdi Ali Khan for Aap Ki Nazron Ne
Professor – Hasrat Jaipuri for Aai Gulbadan

Best Playback Singer
 Bees Saal Baad – Lata Mangeshkar for Kahin Deep Jale Kahin Dil 
Anpadh – Lata Mangeshkar for Aap Ki Nazron Ne
Professor – Mohammad Rafi for Aai Gulbadan

Best Story
 Rakhi – K. P. Kottarakara 
Main Chup Rahungi – Jawar N. Sitaraman
Sahib Bibi Aur Ghulam – Bimal Mitra

Best Cinematography, B&W
 Sahib Bibi Aur Ghulam – V. K. Murthy

Best Editing
 Bees Saal Baad – Keshav Nanda

Best Sound
 Bees Saal Baad – S. Y. Pathak

Biggest winners
Sahib Bibi Aur Ghulam – 4/8
Bees Saal Baad – 4/7
Rakhi – 2/4

See also
9th Filmfare Awards
11th Filmfare Awards
Filmfare Awards

Notes

References

Filmfare Awards
Filmfare
1962 in Indian cinema